Dollberg may refer to:
 Dollberg,  mountain in the Dollberge range in central Germany and the highest point in the state of Saarland

People with the name
 Celina Dollberg (born 1997), German female ski jumper
 Christian Dollberg (born 1971), Argentine former footballer